Hypholomine B is a neuraminidase inhibitor isolated from the fungus Phellinus linteus.

References 

Hispidins
Phellinus